Go to Nassau is a two-CD live album by the rock group the Grateful Dead. It was recorded on May 15 and 16, 1980, at Nassau Coliseum in Uniondale, New York. The album, released in 2002, presents half of the songs played on the final two nights of a three-day run at the venue. It is sequenced to represent a prototypical single Dead concert, similarly to Without a Net. The shows were recorded for the King Biscuit Flower Hour and selections were originally broadcast on FM radio stations, on June 22, 1980. The album's title is a syllepsis, referring figuratively to the band's then-current album, Go to Heaven (from which six songs are represented), and literally to the band going to Nassau County to perform.

Track listing

Disc One
"Jack Straw" > (Robert Hunter, Bob Weir) – 6:34
"Franklin's Tower" (Hunter, Jerry Garcia, Bill Kreutzmann) – 11:58
"New Minglewood Blues" (traditional, arr. Weir) – 7:35
"High Time" (Hunter, Garcia) – 8:52
"Lazy Lightnin' " > (John Perry Barlow, Weir) – 3:44
"Supplication" (Barlow, Weir) – 6:41
"Peggy-O" (trad., arr. Grateful Dead) – 7:32
"Far From Me" (Brent Mydland) – 4:02
"Looks Like Rain" (Barlow, Weir) – 8:12
"China Cat Sunflower" > (Hunter, Garcia) – 5:16
"I Know You Rider" (trad., arr. Grateful Dead) – 6:30

Disc Two
"Feel Like A Stranger" > (Barlow, Weir) – 9:29
"Althea" > (Hunter, Garcia) – 8:22
"Lost Sailor" > (Barlow, Weir) – 5:49
"Saint Of Circumstance" (Barlow, Weir) – 6:45
"Alabama Getaway" (Hunter, Garcia) – 4:50
"Playing In The Band" > (Hunter, Mickey Hart, Weir) – 8:03
"Uncle John's Band" > (Hunter, Garcia) – 8:25
"Drums" > (Hart, Kreutzmann) – 5:26
"Space" > (Grateful Dead) – 2:46
"Not Fade Away" > (Buddy Holly, Norman Petty) – 4:52
"Goin' Down The Road Feeling Bad" > (trad., arr. Grateful Dead) – 6:49
"Good Lovin' " (Artie Resnick, Rudy Clark) – 7:23
Note

Recording dates
May 15, 1980: Disc 1 tracks 1–2 & 5–8, disc 2 tracks 5–12
May 16, 1980: Disc 1 tracks 3–4 & 9–11, disc 2 tracks 1–4

Personnel

Grateful Dead
Jerry Garcia – guitar, vocals
Bob Weir – guitar, vocals
Phil Lesh – electric bass
Brent Mydland – keyboards, vocals
Mickey Hart – drums, percussion
Bill Kreutzmann – drums

Production
Jeffrey Norman – mixing
David Lemieux – compilation producer
Cassidy Law – album coordination
Eileen Law – archival research
Rudson Shurtliff – assistant engineer
Amy Finkle – package design
Robert Minkin – photography
Jim Anderson – photography

Notes

Grateful Dead live albums
2002 live albums
Arista Records live albums